Dinghu East railway station is a railway station in Yong'an, Dinghu District, Zhaoqing, Guangdong, China. It is an intermediate station on the Guangzhou–Foshan–Zhaoqing intercity railway. It opened with the line on 30 March 2016. The station has two island platforms. It is situated adjacent and perpendicular to Zhaoqing East railway station and a walkway is provided for transfer between the two stations.

References 

Railway stations in Guangdong
Railway stations in China opened in 2016